The 2022 Campeonato Uruguayo Femenino C season (2022 Women's Uruguayan Championship C) is the 1st season of the Women's Uruguayan Championship C, Uruguay's third division women's football league and organized by the Uruguayan Football Association. The season is played in two tournaments, Apertura and Clausura, and started on 17 July 2022 due to delays.

Description

Format 
The teams compete in a two-stages system, Apertura and Clausura tournaments, each one consisting of seven gameweeks, from where the champion team and the promotions are defined. The 2022 season of women's football leagues began as late as July due to several deferrals, that then led to criticism of Uruguayan Football Association resolutions by women players.

Teams 
Seven teams competed in the Campeonato Uruguayo Femenino C this season, which were confirmed along the fixture on 6 July:

Torneo Apertura 
The Torneo Apertura (Opening Tournament) of Women's football third division started on 17 July 2022, competing in a round-robin format with a team    being idle each gameweek due to the odd number of teams. La Luz City Park became the champion team of this half in the 6th game after winning against UdelaR and ending this tournament with 5 wins, 1 draw and no losses.

Standings

Fixture 
1st week 

Free: UdelaR.

2nd week 

Free: Huracán Buceo.

3rd week 

Free: Cerrito.

4th week 

Free: Keguay.

5th week 

Free: La Luz City Park.

6th week 

Free: Paso de la Arena.

7th week 

Free: Cerro.

Torneo Clausura 
The Torneo Clausura (Closing Tournament) began on 11 September 2022.

Standings

Fixture 
1st week 

Free: UdelaR.

2nd week 

Free: Huracán Buceo.

3rd week 

Free: Cerrito.

4th week 

Free: Keguay.

5th week 

Free: La Luz City Park.

6th week 

Free: Paso de la Arena.

7th week 

Free: Cerro.

References 

Women's football in Uruguay
2022 in Uruguayan football